The Santa Catalina de Alejandria parish church, also known as the Porac church, is a 19th-century Baroque church located at Barangay Poblacion, Porac, Pampanga, Philippines. The parish church is currently under the ecclesiastical province of the Roman Catholic Archdiocese of San Fernando.

The church's octagonal bell tower collapsed during the 6.1 magnitude earthquake on April 22, 2019.

History
As early as 1594, Porac have had an established convent with the right to vote in the provincial meetings. Despite this, services done by the convent of Porac had been either suspended or annexed to other convents like Lubao and Bacolor, possibly due to lack of resources and/or attacks from the Zambals, an indigenous group living in the areas near the Zambales mountain ranges. Documents, however, give hints of possible construction periods in Porac. In 1710 and 1722, the convent was relieved from paying its rent to the San Agustin Monastery in Manila.

On September 31, 1734, the convent received permission from the Provincial Fathers to use the funds of the convent to build a church. The first masonry church of Porac may have been finished around this time with Fathers Manuel Obregon and Nicolas Mornier responsible for its construction.

The 18th-century church may have sustained severe damages from the 1863 earthquake because according to records, Father Isidro Bernardo laid the foundations of a new stone church sometime in 1872 and was characterized as having three naves and one transept. The said structure was renovated a couple of times since its erection: by Father Esteban Ibeas, parish priest of Santa Rita, in 1877; and in 1880 by Father Galo de la Galle. 

In recent years, much renovations have been executed on the church, especially notable of these are the new naves and transept, which no longer bears any trace of the original stone used in the 19th century. The church and convent were heavily damaged during World War II. Father Daniel Castrillo, the last Augustinian priest of the parish, had the church reinforced with concrete, made other restorations and rebuilt the convent. In the 1980s, the nave and transept of the church were torn down to make the more spacious church seen today.

Architecture
The church measures 52 meters long, 12 meters wide and 9 meters high. The façade is simple, adorned only by Corinthian columns of its first and second levels, iron grills on the windows, the Augustinian emblem on the triangular pediment and rectangular pilasters. The main focal point of the façade is the rose window bearing an image of Saint Catherine of Alexandria rendered on stained glass. Attached to the left of the church is a slender, 4-storey, octagonal bell tower.

Image Gallery

2019 Luzon earthquake 

On April 22, 2019, a 6.1 magnitude earthquake struck the island of Luzon in the Philippines, leaving at least 18 dead, three missing and injuring at least 256 others. Despite of the epicenter was in Zambales, most of the damage to infrastructure occurred in the neighboring province of Pampanga, which suffered damage to 29 buildings and structures, including churches.

During the 2019 Luzon earthquake, the church suffered heavy damage when rubble from the bell tower fell on the nave of the church. Only the ground level of the four-story bell tower is left standing.

See also
 Pio Chapel

References

Roman Catholic churches in Pampanga
Baroque architecture in the Philippines
Spanish Colonial architecture in the Philippines
Churches in the Roman Catholic Archdiocese of San Fernando